Amoria undulata, common name wavy volute, is a species of sea snail, a marine gastropod mollusk in the family Volutidae, the volutes.

Synonyms
 Amoria (Amoria) undulata (Lamarck, 1804)
 Amoria kingi Cox, 1871
 Scaphella moslemica Hedley, 1912
 Voluta angasii Sowerby II, 1864
 Voluta australiae (Cox, 1872)
 Voluta sclateri Cox, 1869
 Voluta undulata Lamarck, 1804 (basionym)

Distribution
This marine species occurs off East Australia and Tasmania.

Description

The length of the shell varies between 60 mm and 120 mm. These shells are elongated, fusiform, smooth and solid and roundly shouldered, with long pointed conical spire. Suture shows a callous edge. The aperture is elongate, salmon to orange in colour, with smooth outer lip, thickened in adults. The base colour of the external surface of the shell is fawn or white-cream, with thin axial wavy brown lines. Foot shows similar coloured zigzag lines and stripes.

Habitat
These sea snails live intertidally on sand and mud, at depths of 9 to 503 m. They live in deeper waters in their northern range. They emerge only at night to feed.

Biology
These gastropods are carnivore, mainly feeding on other sea snails. In the spring Amoria undulata migrates from deep water to shallow water sandbanks to breed. The embryos hatch as well developed juveniles and crawl away.

Bibliography
 A. G. Hinton - Guide to Australian Shells 
 Bail P. & Limpus A. (2001) The genus Amoria. In: G.T. Poppe & K. Groh (eds) A conchological iconography. Hackenheim: Conchbooks. 50 pp., 93 pls
 Harald Douté, M. A. Fontana Angioy - Volutes, The Doute collection
 Wilson, B. (1993). Australian Marine Shells  Part 2

References

External links
 Encyclopedia of life
  Discover Life

Volutidae
Gastropods described in 1804
Gastropods of Australia